Patrik Rosengren (born 25 July 1971), nicknamed Bagarn (Swedish slang for 'The Baker'), is a Swedish football coach, currently for Mjällby AIF (U19), and former footballer who played as a defender.

Career
He started his career at Mjällby AIF in 1990 and played there until 2001. Between 2002 and 2008 he played for Kalmar FF. On 17 November 2008 he signed with Mjällby for 1 year in Superettan. He helped the club gain promotion to Allsvenskan in 2009. In December 2012, he retired from professional football after playing his last match against IF Elfsborg on November 1, 2012.

He is currently the head coach of Mjällby AIF.

Awards and honours

Kalmar FF

Allsvenskan: 1
 2008
Svenska Cupen: 1
 2007

References

External links

Patrik Rosengren profile

1971 births
Living people
Swedish footballers
Kalmar FF players
Mjällby AIF players
Association football defenders